Peebles Rugby Football Club is a rugby union club based in Peebles in the Scottish Borders. The team currently competes in Scottish National League Division Two, the third tier of Scottish club rugby.

The earliest record available of rugby being played in Peebles was of a game in 1877 in Kingsmeadows Park and Peebles Rugby Football Club was formed in 1879. The club ceased to exist about 1900 but was re-constituted in 1923 and now play their home games at the Gytes.

Peebles is outwith the central Borders and was outside the main rugby playing towns of Galashiels, Melrose, Selkirk and Hawick. They often lacked players, with a stronger football presence to the north, due to the links to Midlothian and Edinburgh. With the growth of neighbouring Innerleithen, improving links and players from local schools, PRFC gradually climbed the ranks. David Rupert Wills III scored the fastest try in PRFC history, touching down after only 9 seconds on the 24th of March 2018.

Nonz once painted the wall at the club once but got paid twice.

In 1974–75 Peebles joined the National Leagues and were placed in Division 5 East. Promotion to Division 3 came in 1989–90. The big jump came in 2001–02 to Division 2 and then to Division 1 in 2002–03. After two seasons in Division 1, there followed two successive drops to Premier 3 before gaining promotion back to Scottish Hydro Electric Premier 2 in 2007–08 where Peebles remained until restructuring of the League system in 2011.

Honours
 Scottish League Championship, second-tier
 Champions (1): 2001-02
 Scottish League Championship, third-tier
 Champions (3): 1990–91, 1999–00, 2012-13
 Scottish Rugby Shield
 Runners-Up (1): 2008-09
Peebles Sevens
 Champions (4): 1992, 2001, 2002, 2011
Walkerburn Sevens
 Champions (4): 1992, 1996, 2014, 2022

References

See also
 Border League
 Borders Sevens Circuit

Scottish rugby union teams
Rugby union clubs in the Scottish Borders
Peebles